O'Carroll is an Irish surname. Notable people who use this name include:

Surnames

Brendan O'Carroll (born 1955), Irish actor, comedian, director, producer and writer
 Daniel O'Carroll (died 1713), British army officer
Diarmuid O'Carroll (born 1987), Irish footballer
Eamon O'Carroll (born 1987), Irish rugby footballer
Fintan O'Carroll (1922–1981) (also known by his Irish name Fiontán P Ó Cearbhaill), Irish composer
Gay O'Carroll(born 1964), Irish footballer
 John O'Carroll (born 1958), British artist
Joseph O'Carroll (1891–1965), Australian politician
Maggie O'Carroll, British business leader
 Michael O'Carroll (1911–2004), Irish motoring expert and TV/radio/newspaper correspondent
Paddy O'Carroll (hurler) (1866–1960), Irish hurler
 Paddy O'Carroll (swimmer) (fl. 1986), New Zealand swimmer
Richard O'Carroll (1876–1916), Irish patriot and union Leader
Rory O'Carroll (born 1989), Irish footballer and hurler 
Ross O'Carroll (born 1987), Irish hurling and football player
Sinéad O'Carroll (born 1973), Irish singer and businesswoman
 Susie O'Carroll (b 1987), Irish sportsperson
Tom O'Carroll (born 1945), British writer and paedophilia advocate
William Augustine O'Carroll (1831–1885), Irish nationalist, radical liberal, journalist and Queensland newspaper editor

Fictional
Ross O'Carroll-Kelly, Irish character in various works by Paul Howard

See also

Carroll (surname)
McCarroll
O'Carroll, Irish clan

Irish-language surnames
Surnames from given names